Veikko Salminen (born 12 August 1945) is a Finnish modern pentathlete and épée fencer. He won a bronze medal in the team modern pentathlon event at the 1972 Summer Olympics.

His daughter, Laura Salminen, and son, Ismo Salminen, are also a modern pentathlon athletes.

References 

1945 births
Living people
Sportspeople from Helsinki
Finnish male épée fencers
Olympic fencers of Finland
Olympic modern pentathletes of Finland
Finnish male modern pentathletes
Fencers at the 1976 Summer Olympics
Modern pentathletes at the 1972 Summer Olympics
Olympic bronze medalists for Finland
Olympic medalists in modern pentathlon
Medalists at the 1972 Summer Olympics